Marcos Ezequiel Antonio Cabral y Figueredo (Bany, Island of Haiti, 10 April 1842 – Santo Domingo, Dominican Republic, 3 March 1903) was a Dominican military officer, renowned writer, speaker, and president of the Dominican Republic. Cabral married his second-cousin Altagracia Amelia Báez Andújar, the daughter of President Buenaventura Báez, and begat 7 children: José María, Ramona Antonia, Casilda, Pablo, Buenaventura, Mario Fermín, and Altagracia Amelia Cabral y Báez.

1842 births
1903 deaths
People from Baní
Presidents of the Dominican Republic
Dominican Republic military personnel
Dominican Republic male writers
Dominican Republic people of Canarian descent
Dominican Republic people of French descent
Dominican Republic people of Galician descent
Dominican Republic people of Portuguese descent
White Dominicans